Mohammed Danjuma Goje (born 10 October 1952) was a former Governor of Gombe State, Nigeria under the platform of the People's Democratic Party (PDP), taking office on 29 May 2003 during the 2003 Gombe State gubernatorial election. He is now a member of the All Progressives Congress (APC).

Early life and education 
Goje was born in Pindiga, Akko LGA of Gombe State. He studied Political Science and graduated from Ahmadu Bello University (ABU)  Zaria. He was a member of the Bauchi State House of Assembly from 1979 to 1983. Goje became the Secretary of the National Institute For Medical Research in Yaba, Lagos State in 1984, continuing until 1989.

Political career 
On 25 April 1998 Goje contested and won the seat of Senator representing Gombe Senatorial District on the platform of United Nigeria Congress Party conducted by the National Electoral Commission of Nigeria (NECON) in the aborted democratic transition of General Sani Abacha.He went on to establish his own organization, Zaina Nigeria Ltd, from 1989 to 1999. The company was named after his mother, Hajiya Zainab. Goje contested for the seat of Senator in the Nigerian National Assembly in 1998 and later on became the Minister of State, Power and Steel from 1999 to 2001 under President Olusegun Obasanjo. He was a two times elected Governor of Gombe State from 2003 to May 29th, 2011.
In the April 2011 elections, He was elected Senator for Gombe Central on the PDP ticket.  He was then re-elected in 2015, 2019 and 2023 General elections.

Senate Presidency
Senator Goje stepped down  for Senator Ahmad Lawan from the Senate Presidency race after meeting with President Muhammadu Buhari on Thursday, June 6, 2019. From June 2019 through June 2023, Senator Danjuma Goje is the chairman of the Marine Transport Committee.

Awards and honours 
 Awards of Excellence and Exemplary Leadership, (YOWICAN)
 Award of Excellence, Nigerian Medical Association
 Special Merit Award (ASCON)
 Youth Merit Award, 2009
 Merit Award (NIOB)

References

See also
List of Governors of Gombe State

1952 births
Living people
Governors of Gombe State
Nigerian Muslims
Peoples Democratic Party state governors of Nigeria
Members of the Senate (Nigeria)
Ahmadu Bello University alumni
Peoples Democratic Party (Nigeria) politicians
People from Gombe State